José Nasazzi Yarza (24 March 1901 – 17 June 1968) was a Uruguayan footballer who played as a defender. He captained his country when they won the inaugural FIFA World Cup in 1930.

Career

He was born in Bella Vista, Montevideo to Giuseppe, an Italian immigrant from Esino Lario (near Lecco), and María Jacinta Yarza from the Basque Country of Spain.

Nasazzi is regarded by many as Uruguay's greatest ever football player. He was known as El Gran Mariscal ("The Great Marshal"), and had already won the gold medal at the 1924 and 1928 Olympic Games, as well as the South American Championship in 1923, 1924, and 1926, by the time of the first World Cup. On individual level, he was selected as best player at FIFA World Cup 1930 and twice (1923 and 1935) at South American Championship (the predecessor of Copa America).

During the 1930 FIFA World Cup tournament, Uruguay's only serious rivals were their neighbors Argentina. After defeating Peru and Romania in the first round, Uruguay defeated Yugoslavia 6–1 in the semi-finals to set up a final against Argentina. Although his team were 2–1 behind at half-time, Nasazzi rallied his teammates in the second half, leading them to a 4–2 victory and making himself the first captain to lift the Jules Rimet Trophy.

Although Uruguay refused to defend their title in 1934, Nasazzi won the South American Championship again (in 1935), before retiring in 1937 with 41 international appearances. Throughout his career at Nacional, he played 110 matches and scored 10 goals, including friendlies.

Nasazzi's Baton
Nasazzi's Baton is an unofficial title named after José similar to the Unofficial Football World Championship. It is said to have been held by Uruguay after the first World Cup, and subsequently to have been taken over by any team to beat the holders over 90 minutes in a full international match.

Honours

Club
Lito
Uruguayan Intermedia: 1917, 1920

Roland Moor
Uruguayan 3era Extra: 1921

Bella Vista
Primera División: 1922 -1932

Nacional
Primera División:  1933 – 1937; 1925: European Tour with Nacional; 1927: US Tour with Nacional;.

International
Uruguay
FIFA World Cup: 1930
Football at the Summer Olympics: 1924, 1928
South American Championship: 1923, 1924, 1926, 1935

Individual
Best player at the South American Championship: 1923, 1935
FIFA World Cup Golden Ball: 1930
France Football's World Cup Top-100 1930–1990, 56th: 1994
IFFHS South American Footballer of the Century, 26th: 1999
World Soccer's 100 Greatest Footballers of All Time, 75th: 1999
RSSSF Uruguay All-Time Team: 1999

References

External links

1901 births
1968 deaths
Footballers from Montevideo
1930 FIFA World Cup players
Uruguayan footballers
Association football central defenders
Uruguayan Primera División players
C.A. Bella Vista players
Club Nacional de Football players
Uruguay international footballers
Olympic footballers of Uruguay
Footballers at the 1924 Summer Olympics
Footballers at the 1928 Summer Olympics
Medalists at the 1924 Summer Olympics
Medalists at the 1928 Summer Olympics
Olympic gold medalists for Uruguay
FIFA World Cup-winning captains
FIFA World Cup-winning players
Uruguayan football managers
Uruguay national football team managers
Uruguayan people of Basque descent
Uruguayan people of Italian descent
Olympic medalists in football
Copa América-winning players
Uruguayan people of Lombard descent